Alfredo Pérez (born February 11, 1952) is a retired Venezuelan boxer. He competed for his South American nation at the 1976 Summer Olympics in Montreal, Quebec, Canada. There, he was defeated in the Men's Flyweight (– 51 kg) division by Poland's eventual bronze medal winner Leszek Błażyński. Pérez won the gold medal in the same weight division at the 1974 Central American and Caribbean Games in Santo Domingo, Dominican Republic.

References
 

1952 births
Living people
Flyweight boxers
Boxers at the 1976 Summer Olympics
Olympic boxers of Venezuela
Venezuelan male boxers
AIBA World Boxing Championships medalists
Boxers at the 1975 Pan American Games
Pan American Games bronze medalists for Venezuela
Pan American Games medalists in boxing
Central American and Caribbean Games gold medalists for Venezuela
Competitors at the 1974 Central American and Caribbean Games
Central American and Caribbean Games medalists in boxing
Medalists at the 1975 Pan American Games
20th-century Venezuelan people